Frank Moody (27 August 1900 – 29 July 1963) was a Welsh boxer who fought between 1914 and 1936. He is most notable for winning the British and Empire middleweight boxing championship in 1927 and 1928 and the light-heavyweight title from 1927 to 1929.

Boxing career

Early career
Moody was born in Pontypridd and came from a large family, and was one of seven brothers to fight in the boxing ring. Moody began working down a coal mine at the age of eleven. By the time he was thirteen, he had begun boxing, with his first recorded fight, against "Kid Evans", taking place in Tonypandy at the age of fourteen. His early fights as a youth were mainly held in South Wales, with a few ventures to Plymouth and Liverpool. Some of his early notable bouts included a win over Australian Jack Mignot at Covent Garden and a points loss to Freddie Jacks at Blackheath. Moody gained the nickname "The Pontypridd Puncher" and was notable for his powerful right hand delivery.

By 1919, Moody was fighting on a regular basis, sometimes twice a week. His biggest match to date came on 13 January 1920, when he faced Ted "Kid" Lewis at the Free Trade Hall in Manchester. Although scheduled for twenty rounds, Moody was out-classed by his opponent, losing to Lewis by a first round knock-out. His following boxing career was solid if unspectacular, fighting little known opponents, with some success, around Britain.

Fights in the United States
Moody's fortunes changed when in October 1923 he travelled to the United States to fight a series of bouts, beginning in Massachusetts. He won three arranged bouts in New Bedford, and then beat Jackie Clark in Fall River on 30 November.

On 10 December 1923, Moody fought and beat Young Fisher at Madison Square Garden in New York. This was followed by a points defeat to Lou Bogash in Boston, in February 1924. After a handful of fights in the US, Moody faced Bogash again, this time winning by technical knock-out, and in the fight was reported to be the first person to floor Bogash in a contest. After his victory over Bogash, Moody won two more contests in Massachusetts, over experienced American boxers, George Robinson and Jock Malone. In contrast, his subsequent four fights saw his worst run whilst in America, though facing formidable opposition. Just three days after his victory over Malone, Moody travelled to Waterbury, Connecticut, to fight world middleweight champion Harry Greb. Greb stayed out of the reach of Moody's powerful right, and floored the Welshman in the fourth round with a powerful body shot; and after that Moody had little fight left, being knocked out for the count after a barrage of blows in the sixth. This was followed by defeats in rematches to Bogash and Malone, before facing future light heavyweight champion of the world, Jack Delaney. Delaney won the fight in the fifth on a technical knock-out.

After the Delaney contest, Moody took an uncharacteristic two-month break, before returning to fight Pat McCarthy, who had himself just fought Delaney. Moody won the fight with a first round knock-out, but then lost his next fight to New York's Jeff Smith. After a handful of fights in Massachusetts and Pennsylvania, Moody was given a shot at Kid Norfolk in a match staged at the Yankee Stadium, New York. Moody proved a strong opponent, stopping Norfolk in the fourth round, though Norfolk was at the end of his career, and this would be his penultimate fight. Moody fought another nineteen matches in the United States, including contests against Tiger Flowers, Maxie Rosenbloom and Dave Shade; and on 16 August 1926 he beat Del Fontaine, future Canadian middleweight champion, which was Moody's only fight in Canada.

British return
In December 1926, Moody was back in Britain and in his first few weeks back in Wales, he was boxing in Cardiff, beating Joe Bloomfield in the fourth round. Just two months later Moody was carded to fight Roland Todd at the Royal Albert Hall for the vacant British and Empire middleweight titles. Moody lifted the middleweight belt by beating Todd in a points decision.

On 11 April 1927, Moody fought Gipsy Daniels for the Welsh Light Heavyweight title, but lost on points in a 20-round fight. After a victory over Jack Stanley, he then travelled to Italy for his first fight on mainland Europe, losing to Michele Bonaglia, who would later become the Italian champion. Following the Bonglia defeat, Moody won five straight contests on British soil, before facing Ted Moore for the British Light Heavyweight title, which had been vacated by fellow Welshman, Gipsy Daniels. The fight went the full 20 rounds, with Moody winning on points.

Moody was now fighting with less frequency, and on 6 August 1928 he travelled to Glasgow to face Tommy Milligan for the British middleweight title, which Moody had vacated earlier. Milligan was knocked out in the first round, but Moody would lose his newly recaptured title just three weeks later when he was defeated by Alexander Ireland. That was Moody's final fight of 1928, and in 1929 he fought just four times, which included a win over Italy's Leone Jacovacci, a loss to the great Len Harvey and then losing his British Light Heavyweight title to Harry Crossley.

1930 began well for Moody, when he lifted the Welsh Light Heavyweight title by beating Gipsy Daniels in their third encounter. He then earned a respectable draw against German Ernst Pistulla in a contest in Hamburg. After a win over Theo Sass, he then fought a single match in 1931, before apparently retiring.

Boxing return
In 1935 Moody returned to boxing, winning two fights in Wales. These victories led to a contest with South African heavyweight Ben Foord, which saw Moody beaten in the eighth round in front of his home crowd of Pontypridd. Moody's next two bouts were against one of the greatest Welsh boxers of all time, Tommy Farr. The first encounter was for the Welsh light heavyweight title, and ended in a draw after 15 rounds. The second match with Farr in December 1935 ended in Moody's defeat in the fourth round. Moody ended his boxing career in 1936, losing by technical knockout to Frank Hough.

Notable bouts 

| style="text-align:center;" colspan="7"|
|-  style="text-align:center; background:#e3e3e3;"
|  style="border-style:none none solid solid; "|Result
|  style="border-style:none none solid solid; "|Opponent
|  style="border-style:none none solid solid; "|Type
|  style="border-style:none none solid solid; "|Rd., Time
|  style="border-style:none none solid solid; "|Date
|  style="border-style:none none solid solid; "|Location
|  style="border-style:none none solid solid; "|Notes
|- align=center
|Loss
|align=left| Tommy Farr
|
|
|
|align=left|
|align=left|
|- align=center
|style="background:#abcdef;"|Draw
|align=left| Tommy Farr
|
|
|
|align=left|
|align=left|
|- align=center
|Win
|align=left| Gipsy Daniels
|
|
|
|align=left|
|align=left|
|- align=center
|Loss
|align=left| Len Harvey
|
|
|
|align=left|
|align=left|
|- align=center
|Loss
|align=left| Alexander Ireland
|
|
|
|align=left|
|align=left|
|- align=center
|Win
|align=left| Tommy Milligan
|
|
|
|align=left|
|align=left|
|- align=center
|Loss
|align=left| Gipsy Daniels
|
|
|
|align=left|
|align=left|
|- align=center
|Win
|align=left| Roland Todd
|
|
|
|align=left|
|align=left|
|- align=center
|Win
|align=left| Del Fontaine
|
|
|
|align=left|
|align=left|
|- align=center
|Loss
|align=left| Dave Shade
|
|
|
|align=left|
|align=left|
|- align=center
|style="background:#ddd;"|NC
|align=left| Dave Shade
|
|
|
|align=left|
|align=left|
|- align=center
|Loss
|align=left| Maxie Rosenbloom
|
|
|
|align=left|
|align=left|
|- align=center
|Loss
|align=left| Tiger Flowers
|
|
|
|align=left|
|align=left|
|- align=center
|Win
|align=left| Larry Estridge
|
|
|
|align=left|
|align=left|
|- align=center
|Win
|align=left| Kid Norfolk
|
|
|
|align=left|
|align=left|
|- align=center
|Loss
|align=left| Jeff Smith
|
|
|
|align=left|
|align=left|
|- align=center
|Loss
|align=left| Jack Delaney
|
|
|
|align=left|
|align=left|
|- align=center
|Loss
|align=left| Harry Greb
|
|
|
|align=left|
|align=left|
|- align=center
|Win
|align=left| Gipsy Daniels
|
|
|
|align=left|
|align=left|
|- align=center
|Win
|align=left| Larry Gains
|
|
|
|align=left|
|align=left|
|- align=center
|Loss
|align=left| Roland Todd
|
|
|
|align=left|
|align=left|
|- align=center
|Loss
|align=left| Kid Lewis
|
|
|
|align=left|
|align=left|
|- align=center
|style="background:#abcdef;"|Draw
|align=left| Roland Todd
|
|
|
|align=left|
|align=left|

See also
 List of British light-heavyweight boxing champions
 List of British middleweight boxing champions

References

External links
 
 Image of Moody's boxing gloves from the 1920s Gathering the jewels

|-

|-

1900 births
1963 deaths
Welsh male boxers
Sportspeople from Pontypridd
Middleweight boxers
Light-heavyweight boxers
Welsh miners